"What Do You Want from Me" is a song by Pink Floyd featured on their 1994 album, The Division Bell. Richard Wright and David Gilmour composed the music, with Gilmour and his then-girlfriend and subsequent wife Polly Samson supplying the lyrics. A live version from Pulse was released as a single in Canada, reaching number 28 in the Canadian Top Singles charts.

Song structure and lyrics
The song is a slow, yet rocking ballad. It has a drum roll introduction, followed by a keyboard solo and then a guitar solo. David Gilmour has agreed with an interviewer that it is a "straight Chicago blues tune", while mentioning he is still a blues fan.

In an interview, David Gilmour was asked if the song returned to the theme of alienation from the audience. He responded by saying that it "actually had more to do with personal relationships but drifted into wider territory".

Reception
In a contemporary negative review for The Division Bell, Tom Graves of Rolling Stone described "What Do You Want from Me" as the only track on which "Gilmour sounds like he cares".

Personnel
Pink Floyd
David Gilmourguitars, lead vocals
Richard Wright Wah wah wurlizer piano, Hammond organ, backing vocals
Nick Masondrums

Additional musicians:
Jon Carin - synthesizers
Guy Pratt – bass guitar
Sam Brown – backing vocals
Durga McBroom – backing vocals
Carol Kenyon – backing vocals
Jackie Sheridan – backing vocals
Rebecca Leigh-White – backing vocals

Releases

 The Division Bell, Pink Floyd (1994)original release
 Pulse, Pink Floyd (1995)live album
 Pulse, Pink Floyd (2006)concert film; the song did not appear on the original VHS release (1995), but was added as a bonus feature on the DVD re-release (2006)
 Live at Pompeii, David Gilmour (2017)live album and video recorded during Gilmour's Rattle That Lock Tour

References

1994 songs
Columbia Records singles
Pink Floyd songs
Rock ballads
Blues rock songs
Songs about music
Protest songs
Songs written by David Gilmour
Songs written by Richard Wright (musician)
Songs with lyrics by Polly Samson
Song recordings produced by Bob Ezrin
Song recordings produced by David Gilmour